The 2nd Grenadier Division "Littorio" was one of four divisions raised by Mussolini's Italian Social Republic. Although an infantry formation, it was referred to as a "Grenadier" formation to connect it with preceding Granatieri di Sardegna units.

Organization
2nd Grenadier Division "Littorio": Maj. Gen. Tito Agosti
 Division Headquarters
 Divisional Troops
 2nd Reconnaissance Battalion
 2nd Anti-tank Company (motorized 88mm/L71 guns)
 2nd Mountain Assault Engineer Battalion
 2nd Signal Battalion
 2nd Transport Battalion
 102nd Replacement Battalion "Littorio"
 Scuola d’Alpinismo e Sci ("Mountaineering and Skiing Military School")
 2nd Military Police Section
 Deutsches Verbindungskommando 181 ("German Liaison Unit")
 3rd Infantry Regiment
 HQ Company
 Light Column
 I Infantry Battalion
 II Infantry Battalion
 III Infantry Battalion
 103rd Cacciatori Carri ("Tank Hunters") Company
 4th Alpini Regiment
 HQ Company
 Light Column
 Alpini Battalion "Varese"
 Alpini Battalion "Bergamo"
 Alpini Battalion "Edolo"
 104th Cacciatori Carri ("Tank Hunters") Company
 2nd Artillery Regiment
 I Group with horse-drawn 100mm field guns.
 III Groups with 65mm mountain guns transported by pack mules.

War crimes
The division has been implicated in nineteen instances of war crimes in Italy between November 1944 and May 1945, with around 120 civilians killed in the course of these incidents.

See also
Benito Mussolini
Repubblica Sociale Italiana (Italian Social Republic) [1943-1945]
Esercito Nazionale Repubblicano (Republican National Army)

References

External links
Littorio Infantry Division By Francesco Mioni

Infantry divisions of Italy in World War II